James Maitland may refer to:

 James Maitland of Lethington (born 1568)
 James Maitland, 7th Earl of Lauderdale (1718–1789)
 James Maitland, 8th Earl of Lauderdale (1759–1839) 
 James Maitland, 9th Earl of Lauderdale (1784–1860)
 James Maitland (minister), minister of the Church of Scotland
 James Ramsay-Gibson-Maitland (1848–1897), Scottish aquaculturist

See also 
 James Stewart (1908–1997), American actor, born James Maitland Stewart